Y Ferwig (sometimes spelled Verwig) is a small village and community about 2 to 3 miles from Cardigan, Wales.

Amenities 
The village is made up of a parish church and a few houses. The community includes the villages of Penparc, Felinwynt, Tremain, Mwnt and Gwbert; it also includes Cardigan Island and the National Trust area of Mwnt.

The parish church of St Michael, Tremain, is a grade II* listed building.

See also 
Gwbert
Mwnt

References

External links
www.geograph.co.uk : photos of Y Ferwig and surrounding area

Villages in Ceredigion